A dynasty trust is a trust designed to avoid or minimize estate taxes being applied to family wealth with each subsequent generation. By holding assets in trust and making well-defined (or even no) distributions to beneficiaries at each generation, the assets of the trust are not subject to estate, gift or generation-skipping transfer tax (GST) taxes. Moreover, the wealth can be exempt from GST tax) if properly set up.

By its nature, a dynasty trust can run in perpetuity. Thus, it must be created in a state that either has no rule against perpetuities, such as Delaware or South Dakota, or has a very long perpetuities period, such as in Nevada (365 years) or Wyoming (1,000 years). Dynasty trusts in the United States were created as a reaction to the imposition of the generation-skipping transfer tax on trusts. By keeping assets inside a trust for an extended period of time, wealthy families can by-pass taxes for several generations or even for ever. This effect has been compounded by other favorable state laws that favor the wealthy, such as the elimination of state income taxation and other favorable conditions for managing wealth (such as "quiet trusts") and asset protection.

In 2018, as a result of the doubling of the GST tax exemption by the Tax Cuts and Jobs Act of 2017, very wealthy families in the United States seeking to shelter their wealth from future transfer taxes have taken a new interest in setting up dynasty trusts. As of January 1, 2020, the GST exemption is $11.58 million per person (and twice that for a married couple). Because this exemption (which is the highest ever) is scheduled to sunset on January 1, 2026, and could be repealed sooner depending on new legislation, the interest in dynasty trusts is steadily rising in 2020 just as it did in 2011 when there was a risk that the GST exemption could be severely reduced.

References

Inheritance
Personal taxes
Property law
Taxation in the United States
Wills and trusts